Nanjing Massacre denial is the denial of the fact that Imperial Japanese forces murdered hundreds of thousands of Chinese soldiers and civilians in the city of Nanjing during the Second Sino-Japanese War, an extremely controversial episode in the history of Sino-Japanese relations. Most historians accept the findings of the Tokyo tribunal with respect to the scope and nature of the atrocities which were committed by the Imperial Japanese Army after the Battle of Nanjing. In Japan, however, there has been a debate over the extent and nature of the massacre. 

Estimates of the death toll vary widely, ranging from 40,000 to 200,000. Some scholars, notably revisionists in Japan, have contended that the actual death toll is far lower, or even that the event was entirely fabricated and never occurred at all. These revisionist accounts of the killings have become a staple of Japanese nationalist discourse. The massacre is also only briefly mentioned in some Japanese school textbooks.

Some Japanese journalists and social scientists, such as Tomio Hora and Katsuichi Honda, have played prominent roles in countering Nanjing Massacre denialism in the decades after the killings. Nonetheless, denialist accounts, such as those of Shūdō Higashinakano, have often created controversy in the global media, particularly in China and other East Asian nations.

Relations between Japan and China have been complicated as a result, as denial of the massacre is seen in China as part of an overall unwillingness on Japan's part to admit and apologize for its aggression, or a perceived insensitivity regarding the killings.

National identity
Takashi Yoshida asserts that, "Nanjing has figured in the attempts of all three nations [China, Japan and the United States] to preserve and redefine national and ethnic pride and identity, assuming different kinds of significance based on each country's changing internal and external enemies."

Japan
In Japan, interpretation of the Nanjing Massacre is a reflection upon the Japanese national identity and notions of "pride, honor and shame." Takashi Yoshida describes the Japanese debate over the Nanjing Incident as "crystalliz[ing] a much larger conflict over what should constitute the ideal perception of the nation: Japan, as a nation, acknowledges its past and apologizes for its wartime wrongdoings; or... stands firm against foreign pressures and teaches Japanese youth about the benevolent and courageous martyrs who fought a just war to save Asia from Western aggression." In some nationalist circles in Japan, speaking of a large-scale massacre at Nanjing is regarded as Japan bashing' (in the case of foreigners) or 'self-flagellation' (in the case of Japanese)."

China (People's Republic of China)
David Askew, an associate professor of law at Ritsumeikan Asia Pacific University, characterizes the Nanjing Incident as having "emerged as a fundamental keystone in the construction of the modern Chinese national identity." According to Askew, "a refusal to accept the "orthodox" position on Nanjing can be construed as an attempt to deny the Chinese nation a legitimate voice in international society".

Taiwan (Republic of China)

Former Taiwanese President Lee Teng-hui had, on numerous occasions, claimed that the Nanjing Massacre was purely propaganda perpetrated by the Chinese communists and which could be placed into the same category as "fictitious history". The Taiwanese leader spent the first 22 years of life in Taiwan under Japanese rule, and served as a military officer when the island-nation was still under Japanese rule. In general, attitudes in Taiwan towards Japan are more positive than in the PRC due to the longer and less harsh Japanese administration of Taiwan compared to the Japanese occupation in the PRC. Furthermore, the geopolitical alignment of Taiwan and Japan against the PRC mean that the perception of Japan is less influenced by Japanese actions in WWII and more influenced by contemporary Japanese cultural exports.

Issues of definition

The precise definition of the geographical area involved, duration of the massacre, as well as who is to be considered and counted among the victims, forms a major part of both the definition of the massacre and the arguments of denialists.  Among the most extreme denialists, casualty claims range from several dozen to several hundred. Masaaki Tanaka, a denialist, engaged in academic misconduct to support his claim that the massacre was a fabrication and death tolls were low. However, figures within the range of 50,000–300,000 are typically articulated among more sophisticated and mainstream historians. The International Military Tribunal for the Far East estimated at least 200,000 casualties and at least 20,000 cases of rape.

The common revisionist viewpoint, made by denialists such as Higashinakano Shudo is that the geographical area of the incident should be limited to the few square kilometers of the city, and they typically estimate the population to be about 200,000–250,000. However, this geographic definition is almost universally unheard of outside of revisionist circles. Their use of 200,000–250,000 civilians also only includes those in the Nanjing Safety Zone, which does not include everyone inside of the city.

Most historians include a much larger area around the city, including the Xiaguan district (the suburbs north of Nanjing city, about 31 km2 in size) and other areas on the outskirts of the city. In 2003, Zhang Lianhong estimated that the population of greater Nanjing was between 535,000 and 635,000 civilians and soldiers just prior to the Japanese occupation. In 2008, he revised his estimate to 468,000–568,000. Some historians also include six counties around Nanjing, known as the Nanjing Special Municipality.  With the six surrounding counties included, the population of Nanjing is estimated to be more than 1 million.

The duration of the incident is naturally defined by its geography: the earlier the Japanese entered the area, the longer the duration. The Battle of Nanjing ended on December 13, when the divisions of the Japanese Army entered the walled city of Nanjing. The Tokyo War Crime Tribunal defined the period of the massacre to the ensuing six weeks. More conservative estimates say the massacre started on December 14, when the troops entered the Safety Zone, and that it lasted for six weeks.

Most scholars have accepted figures between 50,000 and 300,000 dead as an approximate total. Revisionists in Japan, however, have contended at times that the actual death toll is far lower, or even that the event was entirely fabricated and never occurred at all.

History and censorship during the War

During the war, Japanese media and newspapers typically portrayed a positive view of the war in China. Reports on the massacre were generally muted, and newspaper reports and photos typically emphasized cooperation between Chinese civilians and Japanese soldiers. Massacre denialists claim that the news published in the Japanese media and newspapers were "true" and "reliable" stories. However, most mainstream historians counter that it is well known that the Naikaku Jōhōkyoku (Cabinet Information Bureau), a consortium of military, politicians and professionals created in 1936 as a "committee" and upgraded to a "division" in 1937, applied censorship of all the media of the Shōwa regime and that this office held a policing authority over the realm of publishing. Therefore, the Naikaku Jōhōkyoku'''s activities were proscriptive as well as prescriptive. Besides issuing detailed guidelines to publishers, it made suggestions that were all but commands. From 1938, the print media "would come to realize that their survival depended upon taking cues from the Cabinet Information Bureau and its flagship publication, Shashin shūhō, designers of the "look" of the soldier, and the "look" of the war."

Article 12 of the censorship guideline for newspapers issued on September 1937 stated that any news article or photograph "unfavorable" to the Imperial Army was subject to a gag. Article 14 prohibited any "photographs of atrocities" but endorsed reports about the "cruelty of the Chinese" soldiers and civilians.

Owing to the censorship, none of the hundred Japanese reporters in Nanjing when the city was captured wrote anything unfavorable to their countrymen. In 1956, however, Masatake Imai, correspondent for the Tokyo Asahi Shimbun who reported only about the "majestic and soul-stirring ceremony" of the triumphal entry of the Imperial Army, revealed he witnessed a mass execution of 400 to 500 Chinese men near Tokyo Asahis office. "I wish I could write about it", he told his colleague Nakamura. "Someday, we will, but not for the time being. But we sure saw it", Nakamura answered.

Shigeharu Matsumoto, the Shanghai bureau chief of Dōmei Tsushin, wrote that the Japanese reporters he interviewed all told him they saw between 2,000 and 3,000 corpses around the Xiaguan area and a reporter, Yuji Maeda, saw recruits executing Chinese prisoners-of-war with bayonets. 

Jiro Suzuki, a correspondent for the Tokyo Nichi Nichi Shimbun, wrote, "When I went back to the Zhongshan Gate, I saw for the first time an unearthly, brutal massacre. On the top of the wall, about 25 meters high, the prisoners of war were rounded up in a line. They were being stabbed by bayonets and shoved away off the wall. A number of Japanese soldiers polished their bayonets, shouted to themselves once and thrust their bayonets in the chest or back of POWs."

Historian Tokushi Kasahara notes, "Some deniers argue that Nanjing was much more peaceful than we generally think. They always show some photographs with Nanjing refugees selling some food in the streets or Chinese people smiling in the camps. They are forgetting about Japanese propaganda. The Imperial Army imposed strict censorship. Any photographs with dead bodies couldn't get through. So photographers had to remove all the bodies before taking pictures of streets and buildings in the city [...] Even if the photos were not staged, the refugees had no choice but to fawn on the Japanese soldiers. Acting otherwise meant their deaths..."

Revived international interest in the Nanjing Massacre

Iris Chang's 1997 book, The Rape of Nanking, renewed global interest in the Nanjing Massacre. The book sold more than half a million copies when it was first published in the US, and according to The New York Times, received general critical acclaim. The Wall Street Journal wrote that it was the "first comprehensive examination of the destruction of this Chinese imperial city", and that Chang "skillfully excavated from oblivion the terrible events that took place". The Philadelphia Inquirer wrote that it was a "compelling account of a horrendous episode that, until recently, has been largely forgotten." The text, however, was not without controversy. Chang's account drew on new sources to break new ground in the study of the period. Japanese ultra-nationalists maintained that the Nanjing Massacre was a fabrication which sought "to demonize the Japanese race, culture, history, and nation."

Massacre affirmation vs. massacre denial

Takashi Hoshiyama characterizes opinion in Japan about the Nanjing Massacre as "broadly divided into two schools of thought: the massacre affirmation school, which asserts that a large-scale massacre took place, and the massacre denial school, which asserts that, a certain number of isolated aberrations aside, no massacre took place."

Hijacking of the debate by layperson activists

David Askew asserts that the debate over the Nanjing Massacre has been hijacked by "two large groups of layperson activists".

"Chinese" are turned into a single, homogenised voice and portrayed as sinister and manipulative twisters of the truth, while the similarly homogenized "Japanese" are portrayed as uniquely evil, as cruel and blood-thirsty beyond redemption, and as deniers of widely accepted historical truths.

Both positions are victimisation narratives. One depicts the Chinese as helpless victims of brutal Japanese imperialism in the winter of 1937–38, while the other depicts the gullible Japanese, innocent in the ways of the world, as victims of Chinese machinations and propaganda in the post-war era.

Japanese perspectives on the massacre

Japanese affirmationists not only accept the validity of these tribunals and their findings, but also assert that Japan must stop denying the past and come to terms with Japan's responsibility for the war of aggression against its Asian neighbors. Affirmationists have drawn the attention of the Japanese public to atrocities committed by the Japanese Army during World War II in general and the Nanjing Massacre in particular in support of an anti-war agenda.

The most extreme denialists, by and large, reject the findings of the tribunals as a kind of "victor's justice" in which only the winning side's version of events are accepted.  Described within Japan as the Illusion School (maboroshi-ha), they deny the massacre and argue that only a few POWs and civilians were killed by the Japanese military in Nanjing.  More moderate denialists argue that between several thousand and 38,000–42,000 were massacred.Hata Ikuhiko 1993

Prominent Japanese denialists

Shudo Higashinakano
Massacre denialists such as Higashinakano argue that the Nanjing Massacre was a fabrication and war-time propaganda spread by the Chinese Nationalists and Communists. He argues that the activities of the Japanese military in Nanjing were in accordance with international law and were humane.  Among other claims, he has denied that there was execution of POWs in uniform, and cited anecdotes claiming that Chinese POWs were treated humanely by Japanese soldiers.  However, Higashinakano has also claimed at times that the executed POWs were illegitimate combatants, and so their execution was legitimate under international law.  Higashinakano believes some several thousand "illegitimate combatants" may have been executed in such a fashion.

What Higashinakano believed is against the articles of Hague Conventions of 1899 and 1907, which was ratified by Japan and China. Japan violated the spirits and the statements of laws of war.
For examples, according to historian Akira Fujiwara, on August 6, 1937, deputy minister of Military of Japan notified Japanese troops in Shanghai of the army's proposition to remove the constraints of international law on the treatment of Chinese prisoners. This directive also advised staff officers to stop using the term "prisoner of war".  During the massacre, Japanese troops in fact embarked on a determined search for former soldiers, in which thousands of young men were captured, most of whom were killed.  In another case, Japanese troops gathered 1,300 Chinese soldiers and civilians at the Taiping Gate and killed them. The victims were blown up with landmines, then doused with petrol before being set on fire.  Those that were left alive afterward were killed with bayonets. F. Tillman Durdin and Archibald Steele, American news correspondents, reported that they had seen bodies of killed Chinese soldiers forming mounds six feet high at Nanjing's Yijiang Gate in the north. Durdin, who was working for the New York Times, made a tour of Nanjing before his departure from the city. He heard waves of machine-gun fire and witnessed the Japanese soldiers gun down some two hundred Chinese within ten minutes. Two days later, in his report to the New York Times, he stated that the alleys and street were filled with civilian bodies, including women and children.

A claim that Harold Timperley, whose report formed the basis of the Tribunal's findings, was reporting only hearsay, and that thus, the figure of 300,000 dead was "unreal", drew a response from Bob Tadashi Wakabayashi, who suggested that Higashinakano's assertions and conclusion were not "sensible":

Higashinakano jumps to this conclusion in all earnestness because he clings to a hypothetical fixation that the Atrocity never happened. This forces him to seize any shred of evidence, whether sound or not, to sustain and systematize that delusion.

Higashinakano has also at times denied the occurrence of mass rape on the part of Japanese troops, at times ascribing it to Chinese soldiers, and at other times simply denying its occurrence.  The occurrence of rape during the massacre is testified to by John Rabe, elected leader of the Nanjing Safety Zone, who writes:

"Two Japanese soldiers have climbed over the garden wall and are about to break into our house. When I appear they give the excuse that they saw two Chinese soldiers climb over the wall. When I show them my party badge, they return the same way. In one of the houses in the narrow street behind my garden wall, a woman was raped, and then wounded in the neck with a bayonet. I managed to get an ambulance so we can take her to Kulou Hospital. [...] Last night up to 1,000 women and girls are said to have been raped, about 100 girls at Ginling Girls College alone. You hear nothing but rape. If husbands or brothers intervene, they're shot. What you hear and see on all sides is the brutality and bestiality of the Japanese soldiers."

Minnie Vautrin, a professor at Ginling College, wrote in her diary on that day, "Oh God, control the cruel beastliness of the Japanese soldiers in Nanking tonight..," and on the 19th, "In my wrath, I wished I had the power to smite them for their dastardly work. How ashamed women of Japan would be if they knew these tales of horror."

Vautrin also wrote in her diary that she had to go to the Japanese embassy repeatedly from December 18 to January 13 to get proclamations to prohibit Japanese soldiers from committing crimes at Ginling because the soldiers tore the documents up before taking women away.

Xia Shuqin, a woman testifying that she had been a massacre victim, sued Higashinakano for defamation for a claim made in a book written in 1998 that the murder of her family had been performed by Chinese, rather than Japanese, soldiers. On 5 February 2009, the Japanese Supreme Court ordered Higashinakano and the publisher, Tendensha, to pay 4 million yen in damages to Mrs. Xia. According to the court, Higashinakano failed to prove that she and the girl were different persons, and that she was not a witness of the Nanjing massacre, as Higashinakano had claimed in his book.

Masaaki Tanaka
Masaaki Tanaka was discredited after it was proven that he engaged in academic misconduct by altering several hundred places of an important document.

In his book The Fabrication of the 'Nanjing Massacre''', Masaaki Tanaka alleges that there was no indiscriminate killing in Nanjing and that the massacre was a fabrication manufactured by the International Military Tribunal for the Far East (IMTFE) and the Chinese government for the purpose of propaganda. He alleged that the Tokyo Tribunal was "victor's justice" and not a fair trial; that there  were 2000 deaths for the entirety of the massacre; and that many civilians were killed by the Chinese military.

See also
2005 anti-Japanese demonstrations
Anti-Chinese sentiment in Japan
Racism in Japan
Sino-Japanese relations
Japanese history textbook controversies
List of war apology statements issued by Japan
Japanese Society for History Textbook Reform
Japanese nationalism
Historiography of the Nanjing Massacre
Shintaro Ishihara
Nippon Kaigi
Japanese war crimes
Genocide denial
Holocaust denial
Holocaust trivialization
Armenian genocide denial
Historical negationism

Notes and references

Bibliography

Academic sources

Denialist sources

Denial

Historical negationism
Anti-Chinese sentiment
Japanese nationalism
Pseudohistory
Reactionary
Nippon Kaigi